This list of songs about Copenhagen is a list of songs about Copenhagen, Denmark.

 Victor Cornelius and Carl Viggo Meincke -  København, København.
 Kai Normann Andersen - Er København den samme som den var engang?
 Danny Kaye - Wonderful Copenhagen (1952)
 Håkan Hellström - Jag har varit i alla städer
 Elga Olga - Solitudevej (1953)
 Bent Fabricius Bjerre/Volmer Sørensen - Forelsket I København
 Cæsar  - Storkespringvandet (1966)
 Keld & The Donkeys  - ’Det var på Fred'riksberg (1967)
 Scott Walker - Copenhagen (1969)
 Gasolin' - Langebro (1971)
 Gasolin' - Se din by fra tårnets top (1972) 
 Benny Holst - Københavner Sang (1974)
 Tom Waits - Tom Traubert's Blues (1976)
 Lone Kellermann - Humret på Nørrebro (1977)
 Peter Belli  - Istedgade (1978)
 Lone Kellerman - Lyngbyvej (1979)
 Sods - Copenhagen (1979)
 Seebach Band - Copenhagen (1979)
 C. V. Jørgensen - Christiania Black Star (1979)
 Van Morrison - Vanlose Stairway (1982)
 [[Kim Larsen}} - Østerbros Svømmehal (2008) 
 Savage Rose - Stjerneskud ( Når Lysene tændes i Parken) (1989) 
 Peter Belli - Peter Belli - København (Fra en DC-9) (1992)
 Dan Turèll and Halfdan E - Gennem Byen Sidste Gang (1993)
 Philippe Katerine - Copenhague (1996)
 Love Shop - Copenhagen Dreaming  (1996)
 Kim Larsen - Jyllingevej (1996)
 Lex & Klatten - Københavnersangen (1998)
 Peter Sommer - Valby Bakke (2000)
 Peter Sommer - Københavns Energi (2000)
 Jokeren - Havnen (2003)
 Rasmus Nøhr - Nørrebro (2004)
 Peter Sommer - Valby Bakke (2004)
 Bael: Copenhagen Streetlight (2005)
 Magtens Korridorer - Vesterbro (2005)
 Thåström. Sönder Boulevard (2005)
 {{Magtens Korridorer]] - Nordhavn Station (2005)
 Magtens Korridorer - Picnic
 Ginman/Jørgensen - Copenhagen Dream World
 Jens Unmack - Sonder Boulevard (2007)
 Allan Olsen - På kanten af Vesterbro (2007)
 Szhirley - Gammel Kongevej (2008)
 Vetusta Morla - Copenhague (2008)
 Ligusterlogik - København (2008)
 Ligusterlogik - Østerbro (2008)
 Kim Larsen - Christianshavns Kanal (2008)
 Peter Belli - Enghave Park (2009)
 Tina Dico - Copenhagen (2010)
 Michael Falch - Over Vesterbros Torv (2010)
 Yjomas Helmig - Ned Ad Nørrebrogade (2010)
 Lucinda Williams - Copenhagen (2011)
 C. V. Jørgensen - Bellevue (2011)
 Ulige Numre - København (2011)
 Magtens Korridorer - Picnic (På Kastellet) (2012)
 Mouritz/Hørslev Projektet - Lindevang St. (2013)
 Folkeklubben: Byens Kro (2013)
 Folkeklubben - Vesterbro Revisited (2013)
 Folkeklubben - Sønder Boulevard (2014)
 Benny Andersons Orkester - En natt i köpenhamn (2016)

References

External links
 Source

 
Copenhagen
Copenhagen-related lists
Music in Copenhagen